Jeff Thomas (1956) is an Iroquois photographer, curator, and cultural theorist who works and lives in Ottawa, Ontario.

Thomas is known for his photographic work that addresses and interrogates the place of First Nations people in contemporary Canadian society. His work includes the "Indians on Tour" series began in 2000, in which stereotypical "Indian" figurines are posed against natural or urban landscapes, otherwise against historical monuments and contemporary culture, as Thomas' photographs document First Nations people.

He is the father of Ehren "Bear Witness" Thomas of the musical group A Tribe Called Red.

Early life
Thomas was born in 1956 in Buffalo, New York.

Photographic career 
Thomas' photographic practice is primarily concerned with showing the perspective of an "urban Iroquoian person," and what he calls “symbols of Indian-ness.” His work has been shown in galleries and museums across Canada, as well as in the United States and parts of Europe. In 1997, Thomas was featured in Ali Kazimi's documentary film, "Shooting Indians: A Journey with Jeffrey Thomas," which premiered at the Toronto International Film Festival.

Collections 
Canadian Museum of Contemporary Photography, Ottawa 
Canadian Museum of Civilization, Ottawa
Carleton University Art Gallery, Ottawa
Library and Archives Canada Ottawa
Oakville Galleries, Oakville, Ontario
Kamloops Art Gallery, Kamloops, B.C. 
National Gallery of Canada, Ottawa
MacLaren Art Centre, Barrie, Ontario 
Museum of the American Indian Washington 
Musée de l’Elysée, Lausanne 
Museum der Weltkulturen Frankfurt 
The British Museum, London
Ottawa Art Gallery 
Winnipeg Art Gallery 
Woodland Cultural Centre, Brantford, Ontario

Selected solo exhibitions 

 2008: Com·mem·o·ra·tion, MacLaren Art Centre, Barrie, Ontario
 2008: Who’s your Daddy?: Four Hundred Years Later, Karsh/Mason Gallery, Ottawa, Ontario
 2008: Don’t Mess with the Pediment, Stephen Bulger Gallery, Toronto
 2008: Drive By: A Road Trip with Jeff Thomas, University of Toronto Art Centre, Toronto, Ontario
 2007: Jeff Thomas: Traces of Iroquois Medicine, Ontario Museum of Archaeology, London, Ontario
 2006: Jeff Thomas: A Study of Indian-ness, Southern Alberta Art Gallery, Lethbridge, Alberta; Grunt Gallery, Vancouver, British Columbia
 2004–2005: Jeff Thomas: A Study of Indian-ness, Art Gallery of Southwestern Manitoba, Brandon, Winnipeg; Regina, Saskatchewan; Toronto, Ontario
 2004: Scouting for Indians, the Oakville Galleries, Oakville, Ontario
 2001: Scouting for Indians, Artspace, Peterborough, Ontario; American Community House, New York City
 2001: Lurking in the Shadows, Musée de l’Elysée, Lausanne, Switzerland
 2001: Geronimo Was in Here, The Buffalo Arts Studio, Buffalo, New York
 2000: Scouting for Indians, Carleton University Art Gallery, Ottawa, Ontario

Awards
In 2008, Thomas was awarded the Karsh Award in Photography. He was a recipient of the Governor General's Award in Visual and Media Arts in 2019.

References

External links
Jeffrey M. Thomas fonds (R10613) at Library and Archives Canada

20th-century Canadian photographers
21st-century Canadian photographers
Iroquois people
First Nations photographers
Living people
1956 births
Governor General's Award in Visual and Media Arts winners
Artists from Buffalo, New York
Artists from Ottawa
American emigrants to Canada